Maia Damianovic (born 1976) is a British-born American writer of art critical texts, magazine articles, exhibition catalogs, artist monograms and art reviews.

Early life and education 
Damianovic was born in southern England, but grew up in Philadelphia, Pennsylvania. She attended the University of Toronto and studied art and culture in at the École des Beaux-Arts of Paris-Sorbonne University.

Career 
Damianovic has worked as an independent curator of large-scale projects for institutions including the Smithsonian (1996), Kunstraum Innsbruck (2000, 2006), Frame Programme of the 49th Venice Biennale (2001), the AR/GE Kunst Galerie Museum in Bolzano, Italy (2002), Steirischer Herbst Festival, Austria (2002), Brandts Klædefabrik, Odense, Denmark (2006), and the Lentos Museum of Contemporary Art, Linz, Austria.

Her projects are usually presented in public and off-site locations, and she specializes in situational and performative interactions, and enactments.

She co-founded Future Systems Projects with Andy Robinson in 2007, where she works as an architectural designer.

In March and April 2015 she curated "Radical Busts", 36 busts of significant women from antiquity through modern times. The collection was featured in the Gender Equality section of the 650th Jubilee at the University of Vienna.

References

Year of birth missing (living people)
Living people
English curators
American art curators
American women curators
University of Toronto alumni
English art critics
American art critics
21st-century American women